This article describes a particle in planar motion when observed from non-inertial reference frames. The most famous examples of planar motion are related to the motion of two spheres that are gravitationally attracted to one another, and the generalization of this problem to planetary motion. See centrifugal force, two-body problem, orbit and Kepler's laws of planetary motion. Those problems fall in the general field of analytical dynamics, determining orbits from the given force laws. This article is focused more on the kinematical issues surrounding planar motion, that is, the determination of the forces necessary to result in a certain trajectory given the particle trajectory. 

General results presented in fictitious forces here are applied to observations of a moving particle as seen from several specific non-inertial frames, for example, a local frame (one tied to the moving particle so it appears stationary), and  a co-rotating frame (one with an arbitrarily located but fixed axis and a rate of rotation that makes the particle appear to have only radial motion and zero azimuthal motion). The Lagrangian approach to fictitious forces is introduced.

Unlike real forces such as electromagnetic forces, fictitious forces do not originate from physical interactions between objects.

Analysis using fictitious forces
The appearance of fictitious forces normally is associated with use of a non-inertial frame of reference, and their absence with use of an inertial frame of reference. The connection between inertial frames and fictitious forces (also called inertial forces or pseudo-forces), is expressed, for example, by Arnol'd:

A slightly different tack on the subject is provided by Iro:

Fictitious forces do not appear in the equations of motion in an inertial frame of reference: in an inertial frame, the motion of an object is explained by the real impressed forces. In a non-inertial frame such as a rotating frame, however,  Newton's first and second laws still can be used to make accurate physical predictions provided fictitious forces are included along with the real forces. For solving problems of mechanics in non-inertial reference frames, the advice given in textbooks is to treat the fictitious forces like real forces and to pretend you are in an inertial frame.

It should be mentioned that "treating the fictitious forces like real forces" means, in particular, that fictitious forces as seen in a particular non-inertial frame transform as vectors under coordinate transformations made within that frame, that is, like real forces.

Moving objects and observational frames of reference
Next, it is observed that time varying coordinates are used in both inertial and non-inertial frames of reference, so the use of time varying coordinates should not be confounded with a change of observer, but is only a change of the observer's choice of description.  Elaboration of this point and some citations on the subject follow.

Frame of reference and coordinate system
The term frame of reference is used often in a very broad sense, but for the present discussion its meaning is restricted to refer to an observer's state of motion, that is, to either an inertial frame of reference or a non-inertial frame of reference.

The term coordinate system is used to differentiate between different possible choices for a set of variables to describe motion, choices available to any observer, regardless of their state of motion. Examples are Cartesian coordinates, polar coordinates and (more generally) curvilinear coordinates.

Here are two quotes relating "state of motion" and "coordinate system":

Time varying coordinate systems
In a general coordinate system, the basis vectors for the coordinates may vary in time at fixed positions, or they may vary with position at fixed times, or both. It may be noted that coordinate systems attached to both inertial frames and non-inertial frames can have basis vectors that vary in time, space or both, for example the description of a trajectory in polar coordinates as seen from an inertial frame. or as seen from a rotating frame. A time-dependent description of observations does not change the frame of reference in which the observations are made and recorded.

Fictitious forces in a local coordinate system

In discussion of a particle moving in a circular orbit, in an inertial frame of reference one can identify the centripetal and tangential forces. It then seems to be no problem to switch hats, change perspective, and talk about the fictitious forces commonly called the centrifugal and Euler force. But what underlies this switch in vocabulary is a change of observational frame of reference from the inertial frame where we started, where centripetal and tangential forces make sense, to a rotating frame of reference where the particle appears motionless and fictitious centrifugal and Euler forces have to be brought into play. That switch is unconscious, but existent.

Suppose we sit on a particle in general planar motion (not just a circular orbit). What analysis underlies a switch of hats to introduce fictitious centrifugal and Euler forces?

To explore that question, begin in an inertial frame of reference. By using a coordinate system commonly used in planar motion, the so-called local coordinate system, as shown in Figure 1, it becomes easy to identify formulas for the centripetal inward force normal to the trajectory (in direction opposite to un in Figure 1), and the tangential force parallel to the trajectory (in direction ut), as shown next.

To introduce the unit vectors of the local coordinate system shown in Figure 1, one approach is to begin in Cartesian coordinates in an inertial framework and describe the local coordinates in terms of these Cartesian coordinates. In Figure 1, the arc length s is the distance the particle has traveled along its path in time t.  The path r (t) with components x(t), y(t) in Cartesian coordinates is described using arc length s(t) as:

One way to look at the use of s is to think of the path of the particle as sitting in space, like the trail left by a skywriter, independent of time. Any position on this path is described by stating its distance s from some starting point on the path. Then an incremental displacement along the path ds is described by:

where primes are introduced to denote derivatives with respect to s. The magnitude of this displacement is ds, showing that:

This displacement is necessarily tangent to the curve at s, showing that the unit vector tangent to the curve is:

while the outward unit vector normal to the curve is 

Orthogonality can be verified by showing the vector dot product is zero.

As an aside, notice that the use of unit vectors that are not aligned along the Cartesian xy-axes does not mean we are no longer in an inertial frame. All it means is that we are using unit vectors that vary with s to describe the path, but still observe the motion from the inertial frame.

Using the tangent vector, the angle of the tangent to the curve, say θ, is given by:
 and 
The radius of curvature is introduced completely formally (without need for geometric interpretation) as:

The derivative of θ can be found from that for sin θ:

Now:

in which the denominator is unity according to Eq. 1. With this formula for the derivative of the sine, the radius of curvature becomes:

where the equivalence of the forms stems from differentiation of Eq. 1:

Having set up the description of any position on the path in terms of its associated value for s, and having found the properties of the path in terms of this description, motion of the particle is introduced by stating the particle position at any time t as the corresponding value s (t).

Using the above results for the path properties in terms of s, the acceleration in the inertial reference frame as described in terms of the components normal and tangential to the path of the particle can be found in terms of the function s(t) and its various time derivatives (as before, primes indicate differentiation with respect to s)

This result for acceleration is the same as that for circular motion based on the radius ρ. Using this coordinate system in the inertial frame, it is easy to identify the force normal to the trajectory as the centripetal force and that parallel to the trajectory as the tangential force.

Next, we change observational frames. Sitting on the particle, we adopt a non-inertial frame where the particle is at rest (zero velocity). This frame has a continuously changing origin, which at time t is the center of curvature (the center of the osculating circle in Figure 1) of the path at time t, and whose rate of rotation is the angular rate of motion of the particle about that origin at time t. This non-inertial frame also employs unit vectors normal to the trajectory and parallel to it.

The angular velocity of this frame is the angular velocity of the particle about the center of curvature at time t.  The centripetal force of the inertial frame is interpreted  in the non-inertial frame where the body is at rest as a force necessary to overcome the centrifugal force. Likewise, the force causing any acceleration of speed along the path seen in the inertial frame becomes the force necessary to overcome the Euler force in the non-inertial frame where the particle is at rest. There is zero Coriolis force in the frame, because the particle has zero velocity in this frame. For a pilot in an airplane, for example, these fictitious forces are a matter of direct experience.  However, these fictitious forces cannot be related to a simple observational frame of reference other than the particle itself, unless it is in a particularly simple path, like a circle.

That said, from a qualitative standpoint, the path of an airplane can be approximated by an arc of a circle for a limited time, and for the limited time a particular radius of curvature applies, the centrifugal and Euler forces can be analyzed on the basis of circular motion with that radius. See article discussing turning an airplane.

Next, reference frames rotating about a fixed axis are discussed in more detail.

Fictitious forces in polar coordinates

Description of particle motion often is simpler in non-Cartesian coordinate systems, for example, polar coordinates. When equations of motion are expressed in terms of any curvilinear coordinate system, extra terms appear that represent how the basis vectors change as the coordinates change. These terms arise automatically on transformation to polar (or cylindrical) coordinates and are thus not fictitious forces, but rather are simply added terms in the acceleration in polar coordinates.

Two terminologies
In a purely mathematical treatment, regardless of the frame that the coordinate system is associated with (inertial or non-inertial), extra terms appear in the acceleration of an observed particle when using curvilinear coordinates. For example, in polar coordinates the acceleration is given by (see below for details):

which contains not just double time derivatives of the coordinates but added terms. This example employs polar coordinates, but more generally the added terms depend upon which coordinate system is chosen (that is, polar, elliptic, or whatever).
Sometimes these coordinate-system dependent terms also are referred to as "fictitious forces", introducing a second meaning for "fictitious forces", despite the fact that these terms do not have the vector transformation properties expected of forces. For example, see Shankar and Hildebrand. According to this terminology, fictitious forces are determined in part by the coordinate system itself, regardless of the frame it is attached to, that is, regardless of whether the coordinate system is attached to an inertial or a non-inertial frame of reference. In contrast, the fictitious forces defined in terms of the state of motion of the observer vanish in inertial frames of reference. To distinguish these two terminologies, the fictitious forces that vanish in an inertial frame of reference, the inertial forces of Newtonian mechanics, are called in this article the "state-of-motion" fictitious forces and those that originate in the interpretation of time derivatives in particular coordinate systems are called "coordinate" fictitious forces.

Assuming it is clear that "state of motion" and "coordinate system" are different, it follows that the dependence of centrifugal force (as in this article) upon "state of motion" and its independence from "coordinate system", which contrasts with the "coordinate" version with exactly the opposite dependencies, indicates that two different ideas are referred to by the terminology "fictitious force". The present article emphasizes one of these two ideas ("state-of-motion"), although the other also is described.

Below, polar coordinates are introduced for use in (first) an inertial frame of reference and then (second) in a rotating frame of reference. The two different uses of the term "fictitious force" are pointed out. First, however, follows a brief digression to explain further how the "coordinate" terminology for fictitious force has arisen.

Lagrangian approach

To motivate the introduction of "coordinate" inertial forces by more than a reference to "mathematical convenience", what follows is a digression to show these forces correspond to what are called by some authors "generalized" fictitious forces or "generalized inertia forces". These forces are introduced via the Lagrangian mechanics approach to mechanics based upon describing a system by generalized coordinates usually denoted as {qk}. The only requirement on these coordinates is that they are necessary and sufficient to uniquely characterize the state of the system: they need not be (although they could be) the coordinates of the particles in the system. Instead, they could be the angles and extensions of links in a robot arm, for instance. If a mechanical system consists of N particles and there are m independent kinematical conditions imposed, it is possible to characterize the system uniquely by n = 3N - m independent generalized coordinates {qk}.

In classical mechanics, the Lagrangian is defined as the kinetic energy, of the system minus its potential energy, . In symbols, 

Under conditions that are given in Lagrangian mechanics, if the Lagrangian of a system is known, then the equations of motion of the system may be obtained by a direct substitution of the expression for the Lagrangian into the Euler–Lagrange equation, a particular family of partial differential equations.

Here are some definitions:

Definition:  is the Lagrange function or Lagrangian, qi are the generalized coordinates,  are generalized velocities,
   are generalized momenta,
   are generalized forces,
   are Lagrange's equations.

It is not the purpose here to outline how Lagrangian mechanics works. The interested reader can look at other articles explaining this approach. For the moment, the goal is simply to show that the Lagrangian approach can lead to "generalized fictitious forces" that do not vanish in inertial frames. What is pertinent here is that in the case of a single particle, the Lagrangian approach can be arranged to capture exactly the "coordinate" fictitious forces just introduced.

To proceed, consider a single particle, and introduce the generalized coordinates as {qk} = (r, θ). Then Hildebrand  shows in polar coordinates with the qk = (r, θ) the "generalized momenta" are:

leading, for example, to the generalized force:

with Qr the impressed radial force. The connection between "generalized forces" and Newtonian forces varies with the choice of coordinates. This Lagrangian formulation introduces exactly the "coordinate" form of fictitious forces mentioned above that allows "fictitious" (generalized) forces in inertial frames, for example, the term  Careful reading of Hildebrand shows he doesn't discuss the role of "inertial frames of reference", and in fact, says "[The] presence or absence [of inertia forces] depends, not upon the particular problem at hand but upon the coordinate system chosen." By coordinate system presumably is meant the choice of {qk}. Later he says "If accelerations associated with generalized coordinates are to be of prime interest (as is usually the case), the [nonaccelerational] terms may be conveniently transferred to the right … and considered as additional (generalized) inertia forces. Such inertia forces are often said to be of the Coriolis type."

In short, the emphasis of some authors upon coordinates and their derivatives and their introduction of (generalized) fictitious forces that do not vanish in inertial frames of reference is an outgrowth of the use of generalized coordinates in Lagrangian mechanics. For example, see McQuarrie Hildebrand, and von Schwerin. Below is an example of this usage as employed in the design of robotic manipulators:

For a robot manipulator, the equations may be written in a form using Christoffel symbols Γijk (discussed further below) as:

The terms involving Christoffel symbols therefore determine the "generalized centrifugal" and "generalized Coriolis" terms.

The introduction of generalized fictitious forces often is done without notification and without specifying the word "generalized".  This sloppy use of terminology leads to endless confusion because these generalized fictitious forces, unlike the standard "state-of-motion" fictitious forces, do not vanish in inertial frames of reference.

Polar coordinates in an inertial frame of reference

Below, the acceleration of a particle is derived as seen in an inertial frame using polar coordinates. There are no "state-of-motion" fictitious forces in an inertial frame, by definition. Following that presentation, the contrasting terminology of "coordinate" fictitious forces is presented and critiqued on the basis of the non-vectorial transformation behavior of these "forces".

In an inertial frame, let  be the position vector of a moving particle. Its Cartesian components (x, y) are:

with polar coordinates r and θ depending on time t.

Unit vectors are defined in the radially outward direction : 

and in the direction at right angles to :

These unit vectors vary in direction with time:

and:

Using these derivatives, the first and second derivatives of position are:

where dot-overmarkings indicate time differentiation. With this form for the acceleration , in an inertial frame of reference Newton's second law expressed in polar coordinates is:

where F is the net real force on the particle. No fictitious forces appear because all fictitious forces are zero by definition in an inertial frame.

From a mathematical standpoint, however, it sometimes is handy to put only the second-order derivatives on the right side of this equation; that is we write the above equation by rearrangement of terms as:

where a "coordinate" version of the "acceleration" is introduced:

consisting of only second-order time derivatives of the coordinates r and θ. The terms moved to the force-side of the equation are now treated as extra "fictitious forces" and, confusingly, the resulting forces also are called the "centrifugal" and "Coriolis" force.

These newly defined "forces" are non-zero in an inertial frame, and so certainly are not the same as the previously identified fictitious forces that are zero in an inertial frame and non-zero only in a non-inertial frame. In this article, these newly defined forces are called the "coordinate" centrifugal force and the "coordinate" Coriolis force to separate them from the "state-of-motion" forces.

Change of origin 

Here is an illustration showing the so-called "centrifugal term"  does not transform as a true force, putting any reference to this term not just as a "term", but as a centrifugal force, in a dubious light. Suppose in frame S a particle moves radially away from the origin at a constant velocity. See Figure 2. The force on the particle is zero by Newton's first law. Now we look at the same thing from frame S' , which is the same, but displaced in origin. In S'  the particle still is in straight line motion at constant speed, so again the force is zero.

What if we use polar coordinates in the two frames? In frame S the radial motion is constant and there is no angular motion. Hence, the acceleration is:

There is no force, including no  "force" in frame S.
In frame S' , however, we have:

In this case the azimuthal term is zero, being the rate of change of angular momentum. To obtain zero acceleration in the radial direction, however, we require:

The right-hand side is non-zero, inasmuch as neither  nor  is zero. That is, we cannot obtain zero force (zero ) if we retain only  as the acceleration; we need both terms.

Despite the above facts, suppose we adopt polar coordinates, and wish to say that  is "centrifugal force", and reinterpret  as "acceleration" (without dwelling upon any possible justification). How does this decision fare when we consider that a proper formulation of physics is geometry and coordinate-independent? See the article on general covariance. To attempt to form a covariant expression, this so-called centrifugal "force" can be put into vector notation as:

with:

and  a unit vector normal to the plane of motion. Unfortunately, although this expression formally looks like a vector, when an observer changes origin the value of  changes (see Figure 2), so observers in the same frame of reference standing on different street corners see different "forces" even though the actual events they witness are identical.
How can a physical force (be it fictitious or real) be zero in one frame S, but non-zero in another frame S'  identical, but a few feet away? Even for exactly the same particle behavior the expression  is different in every frame of reference, even for very trivial distinctions between frames. In short, if we take  as "centrifugal force", it does not have a universal significance: it is unphysical.

Beyond this problem, the real impressed net force is zero. (There is no real impressed force in straight-line motion at constant speed). If we adopt polar coordinates, and wish to say that  is "centrifugal force", and reinterpret  as "acceleration", the oddity results in frame S'  that straight-line motion at constant speed requires a net force in polar coordinates, but not in Cartesian coordinates. Moreover, this perplexity applies in frame S, but not in frame S.

The absurdity of the behavior of  indicates that one must say that   is not centrifugal force, but simply one of two terms in the acceleration. This view, that the acceleration is composed of two terms, is frame-independent: there is zero centrifugal force in any and every inertial frame. It also is coordinate-system independent: we can use Cartesian, polar, or any other curvilinear system: they all produce zero.

Apart from the above physical arguments, of course, the derivation above, based upon application of the mathematical rules of differentiation, shows the radial acceleration does indeed consist of the two terms .

That said, the next subsection shows  there is a connection between these centrifugal and Coriolis terms and the fictitious forces that pertain to a particular rotating frame of reference (as distinct from an inertial frame).

Co-rotating frame
In the case of planar motion of a particle, the "coordinate" centrifugal and Coriolis acceleration terms found above to be non-zero in an inertial frame can be shown to be the negatives of the "state-of-motion" centrifugal and Coriolis terms that appear in a very particular non-inertial co-rotating frame (see next subsection). See Figure 3. To define a co-rotating frame, first an origin is selected from which the distance r(t) to the particle is defined. An axis of rotation is set up that is perpendicular to the plane of motion of the particle, and passing through this origin. Then, at the selected moment t, the rate of rotation of the co-rotating frame Ω is made to match the rate of rotation of the particle about this axis, dθ/dt. The co-rotating frame applies only for a moment, and must be continuously re-selected as the particle moves. For more detail, see Polar coordinates, centrifugal and Coriolis terms.

Polar coordinates in a rotating frame of reference
Next, the same approach is used to find the fictitious forces of a (non-inertial) rotating frame. For example, if a rotating polar coordinate system is adopted for use in a rotating frame of observation, both rotating at the same constant counterclockwise rate Ω, we find the equations of motion in this frame as follows: the radial coordinate in the rotating frame is taken as r, but the angle θ' in the rotating frame changes with time:

Consequently,

Plugging this result into the acceleration using the unit vectors of the previous section:

The leading two terms are the same form as those in the inertial frame, and they are the only terms if the frame is not rotating, that is, if Ω=0. However, in this rotating frame we have the extra terms:

The radial term Ω2 r is the centrifugal force per unit mass due to the system's rotation at rate Ω and the radial term  is the radial component of the Coriolis force per unit mass, where  is the tangential component of the particle velocity as seen in the rotating frame. The term  is the so-called azimuthal component of the Coriolis force per unit mass. In fact, these extra terms can be used to measure Ω and provide a test to see whether or not the frame is rotating, just as explained in the example of rotating identical spheres. If the particle's motion can be described by the observer using Newton's laws of motion without these Ω-dependent terms, the observer is in an inertial frame of reference where Ω = 0.

These "extra terms" in the acceleration of the particle are the "state of motion" fictitious forces for this rotating frame, the forces introduced by rotation of the frame at angular rate Ω.

In this rotating frame, what are the "coordinate" fictitious forces? As before, suppose we choose to put only the second-order time derivatives on the right side of Newton's law:

If we choose for convenience to treat  as some so-called "acceleration", then the terms  are added to the so-called "fictitious force", which are not "state-of-motion" fictitious forces, but are actually components of force that persist even when Ω=0, that is, they persist even in an inertial frame of reference. Because these extra terms are added, the "coordinate" fictitious force is not the same as the "state-of-motion" fictitious force. Because of these extra terms, the "coordinate" fictitious force is not zero even in an inertial frame of reference.

More on the co-rotating frame
Notice however, the case of a rotating frame that happens to have the same angular rate as the particle, so that Ω = dθ/dt at some particular moment (that is, the polar coordinates are set up in the instantaneous, non-inertial co-rotating frame of Figure 3). In this case, at this moment, dθ'/dt = 0. In this co-rotating non-inertial frame at this moment the "coordinate" fictitious forces are only those due to the motion of the frame, that is, they are the same as the "state-of-motion" fictitious forces, as discussed in the remarks about the co-rotating frame of Figure 3 in the previous section.

Fictitious forces in curvilinear coordinates

To quote Bullo and Lewis: "Only in exceptional circumstances can the configuration of Lagrangian system be described by a vector in a vector space. In the natural mathematical setting, the system's configuration space is described loosely as a curved space, or more accurately as a differentiable manifold."

Instead of Cartesian coordinates, when equations of motion are expressed in a curvilinear coordinate system, Christoffel symbols appear in the acceleration of a particle expressed in this coordinate system, as described below in more detail. Consider description of a particle motion from the viewpoint of an inertial frame of reference in curvilinear coordinates. Suppose the position of a point P in Cartesian coordinates is (x, y, z) and in curvilinear coordinates is (q1, q2. q3). Then functions exist that relate these descriptions:

and so forth. (The number of dimensions may be larger than three.) An important aspect of such coordinate systems is the element of arc length that allows distances to be determined. If the curvilinear coordinates form an orthogonal coordinate system, the element of arc length ds is expressed as:

where the quantities hk are called scale factors. A change dqk in qk causes a displacement hk dqk along the coordinate line for qk. At a point P, we place unit vectors ek  each tangent to a coordinate line of a variable qk. Then any vector can be expressed in terms of these basis vectors, for example, from an inertial frame of reference, the position vector of a moving particle r located at time t at position P becomes:

where qk is the vector dot product of r and ek.
The velocity v of a particle at P, can be expressed at P as:

where vk is the vector dot product of v and ek, and over dots indicate time differentiation.
The time derivatives of the basis vectors can be expressed in terms of the scale factors introduced above. for example:
 or, in general  
in which the coefficients of the unit vectors are the Christoffel symbols for the coordinate system. The general notation and formulas for the Christoffel symbols are:

and the symbol is zero when all the indices are different. Despite appearances to the contrary, the Christoffel symbols do not form the components of a tensor. For example, they are zero in Cartesian coordinates, but not in polar coordinates.

Using relations like this one,

which allows all the time derivatives to be evaluated. For example, for the velocity:

with the Γ-notation for the Christoffel symbols replacing the curly bracket notation.
Using the same approach, the acceleration is then

Looking at the relation for acceleration, the first summation contains the time derivatives of velocity, which would be associated with acceleration if these were Cartesian coordinates, and the second summation (the one with Christoffel symbols) contains terms related to the way the unit vectors change with time.

"State-of-motion" versus "coordinate" fictitious forces
Earlier in this article a distinction was introduced between two terminologies, the fictitious forces that vanish in an inertial frame of reference are called in this article the "state-of-motion" fictitious forces and those that originate from differentiation in a particular coordinate system are called "coordinate" fictitious forces. Using the expression for the acceleration above, Newton's law of motion in the inertial frame of reference becomes:

where F is the net real force on the particle. No "state-of-motion" fictitious forces are present because the frame is inertial, and "state-of-motion" fictitious forces are zero in an inertial frame, by definition.

The "coordinate" approach to Newton's law above is to retain the second-order time derivatives of the coordinates {qk} as the only terms on the right side of this equation, motivated more by mathematical convenience than by physics. To that end, the force law can be rewritten, taking the second summation to the force-side of the equation as:

with the convention that the "acceleration"  is now:

In the expression above, the summation added to the force-side of the equation now is treated as if added "forces" were present. These summation terms are customarily called fictitious forces within this "coordinate" approach, although in this inertial frame of reference all "state-of-motion" fictitious forces are identically zero. Moreover, these "forces" do not transform under coordinate transformations as vectors. Thus, the designation of the terms of the summation as "fictitious forces" uses this terminology for contributions that are completely different from any real force, and from the "state-of-motion" fictitious forces. What adds to this confusion is that these "coordinate" fictitious forces are divided into two groups and given the same names as the "state-of-motion" fictitious forces, that is, they are divided into "centrifugal" and "Coriolis" terms, despite their inclusion of terms that are not the "state-of-motion" centrifugal and Coriolis terms. For example, these "coordinate" centrifugal and Coriolis terms can be nonzero even in an inertial frame of reference where the "state-of-motion" centrifugal force (the subject of this article) and Coriolis force always are zero.

If the frame is not inertial, for example, in a rotating frame of reference, the "state-of-motion" fictitious forces are included in the above "coordinate" fictitious force expression. Also, if the "acceleration" expressed in terms of first-order time derivatives of the velocity happens to result in terms that are not simply second-order derivatives of the coordinates {qk} in time, then these terms that are not second-order also are brought to the force-side of the equation and included with the fictitious forces. From the standpoint of a Lagrangian formulation, they can be called generalized fictitious forces. See Hildebrand, for example.

Formulation of dynamics in terms of Christoffel symbols and the "coordinate" version of fictitious forces is used often in the design of robots in connection with a Lagrangian formulation of the equations of motion.

Notes and references

Further reading
 Newton's description in Principia
 Centrifugal reaction force - Columbia electronic encyclopedia
 M. Alonso and E.J. Finn, Fundamental university physics, Addison-Wesley
 Centripetal force vs. Centrifugal force  - from an online Regents Exam physics tutorial by the Oswego City School District
 Centrifugal force acts inwards near a black hole
 Centrifugal force at the HyperPhysics concepts site
 A list of interesting links

External links
 Motion over a flat surface Java physlet by Brian Fiedler (from School of Meteorology at the University of Oklahoma) illustrating fictitious forces. The physlet shows both the perspective as seen from a rotating and from a non-rotating point of view.
 Motion over a parabolic surface Java physlet by Brian Fiedler (from School of Meteorology at the University of Oklahoma) illustrating fictitious forces. The physlet shows both the perspective as seen from a rotating and as seen from a non-rotating point of view.
 Animation clip showing scenes as viewed from both an inertial frame and a rotating frame of reference, visualizing the Coriolis and centrifugal forces.
 Centripetal and Centrifugal Forces at MathPages
 Centrifugal Force at h2g2
 John Baez: Does centrifugal force hold the Moon up?

See also 

 Calculating relative centrifugal force
 Circular motion
 Coriolis force
 Coriolis effect (perception)
 Equivalence principle
 Bucket argument
 Frame of reference
 Inertial frame of reference
 Rotational motion
 Euler force - a force that appears when the frame angular rotation rate varies
 Centripetal force
 Reactive centrifugal force - a force that occurs as reaction due to a centripetal force
Centrifugal force
 Fictitious force – a force that can be made to vanish by changing frame of reference
 G-force
 Orthogonal coordinates
 Osculating circle
 Frenet-Serret formulas
 Statics
 Kinetics (physics)
 Kinematics
 Applied mechanics
Analytical mechanics
Dynamics (physics)
Classical mechanics
D'Alembert's principle
Centrifuge

Fictitious forces
Force
Mechanics
Rotation